Longpré-les-Corps-Saints is a railway station located in the commune of Longpré-les-Corps-Saints in the Somme department, France. The station is served by TER Hauts-de-France trains (Abbeville - Amiens - Albert line).

It is at km 157.953 of the Longueau–Boulogne railway and km 44.1 of the Canaples–Longroy-Gamaches railway, which is partly abandoned. Its elevation is 15 m. It has two platforms.

The station

The station was a junction station of the Longueau–Boulogne railway and the Canaples–Longroy-Gamaches railway. Passenger service on the latter was stopped in 1938. The section between Longpré and Longroy/Gamaches has been demolished.

See also
List of SNCF stations in Hauts-de-France

References

External links

 Website about the abandoned rail lines in the Somme department 

Railway stations in Somme (department)
Railway stations in France opened in 1847